The discography of Danity Kane, an American R&B duo, consists of three studio album, five singles, and four music videos. Danity Kane were formed in 2005 during the third season of the reality television series Making the Band, and consisted of Aubrey O'Day, Wanita "D. Woods" Woodgett, Shannon Bex, Dawn Richard, and Aundrea Fimbres. The group disbanded in January 2009 during the fourth season of Making the Band. The group released their self titled debut album in August 2006. The album reached number one on the United States Billboard 200 and was certified platinum by the Recording Industry Association of America (RIAA). Danity Kane's debut single, "Show Stopper", which featured rapper Yung Joc, reached number eight on the US Billboard Hot 100. "Ride for You", their second single, reached number 78 on the Billboard Hot 100. Welcome to the Dollhouse, Danity Kane's second album, was released in March 2008. It reached number one on the Billboard 200 and was certified gold by the RIAA. The album's lead single, "Damaged", reached number ten on the Billboard Hot 100 and was certified platinum by the RIAA. The group's fifth single, "Bad Girl", featured Missy Elliott and reached number 10 on the Bubbling Under Hot 100 chart.

Albums

Studio albums

Extended plays

Singles

Other charted songs

Music videos

Notes

References
General

[ "Danity Kane > Discography"]. AllMusic. Retrieved April 18, 2009.

Specific

External links
Official website

Kane, Danity
Rhythm and blues discographies